Harry Atmore (14 December 1870 – 20 August 1946) was a New Zealand Independent Member of Parliament for Nelson in the South Island.

Harry Atmore held the Nelson seat as an Independent for a total of thirty years from 1911 to 1914 and then from 1919 to his death in 1946. He was Minister of Education and Minister in charge of the Department of Scientific and Industrial Research (DSIR) in Sir Joseph Ward's United Government of 1928 to 1931, and the acting Prime Minister of New Zealand for approximately five months between 25 August 1930 and 21 January 1931.

Early years
Born in Nelson, in 1870, Atmore attended the publicly funded School in Bridge Street, Nelson and represented the province in rugby. He later moved to Wellington and spent eight years there as an apprentice signwriter and decorator. After his apprenticeship, Atmore returned to Nelson and established his own signwriting and decorating business.

Atmore was prominent in local affairs. He was a member of the Nelson Licensing Committee, Education Board and Hospital Board. In 1905, he was elected to the Nelson City Council. Later, he served on the Nelson College Council of Governors and Cawthron Institute Trust Board.

Member of Parliament

Atmore unsuccessfully contested the Nelson seat in 1902, 1905 and 1908 against the Liberal John Graham. In 1911 he became Nelson's Member of Parliament. Atmore gave his support in Joseph Ward's Liberal government by voting for it on a no-confidence motion, which was saved by just one vote. Whilst remaining an independent, he normally supported the Liberals from then on. Regardless, Atmore's political independence was always discernible. He believed that politicians should be, first and foremost, representatives of the people. That when elected they should put principle before party.

Atmore lost his seat in the 1914 election, but returned to parliament in 1919 after unsuccessfully contesting the Wellington Central  which was won by Peter Fraser, the Labour Party candidate.

Initially, Atmore was opposed to the rising Labour Party and was doubtful of its socialist agenda. He was also an admirer of Benito Mussolini due to his opposition to socialist radicals in Italy. As a result, Labour put considerable effort in to defeat him in 1925. Gradually Atmore's animosity towards Labour lessened and Labour did not stand a candidate against him after that.

Following the 1928 election he supported Ward's new United Party form a majority and was rewarded with a position in cabinet, as Minister of Education. As a largely self-educated man, he had passionate concern for education and took to his new responsibilities with vigor. Atmore's first goal as education minister was to ensure every child in New Zealand could have the opportunity to gain a proper education to realise their own potential. He formed a committee to examine the existing public education system. The outcome was the "Atmore Report" which recommended several radical reforms including raising the age to leave school to 15, establishing intermediate schools, abolishing scholarship entry to secondary school, and widening the secondary school curriculum to also cover non University approved subjects.

Atmore resigned as education minister in 1931 when cuts were proposed for his portfolio due to the worsening depression and formation of the coalition government which he was opposed to. However, many of his ideas were later implemented under the First Labour Government where Peter Fraser (who was a member of Atmore's Committee) was minister of education. Fraser's Education Amendment Act 1938 was to endorse and implement most of Atmore's recommendations.

Atmore read and thought widely. He was one New Zealander who was looking for solutions to problems within the altered economic, social and political context of inter-war New Zealand. He believed it was important to be informed on the issues of the day including monetary reform, international rearmament and the pivotal role of the USSR in any crisis. Curiously, he was a social credit monetary reform sponsor and campaigned for it vigorously, blaming many of New Zealand's debt problems in the early 1930s on obligations to pay interest on its debts in London.

On 8 August 1946 Atmore announced his intention not to stand again at the next election. However, only two weeks later, on 20 August, he was found dead at his home. He was buried at Wakapuaka Cemetery.

Personal life
Atmore was a well known man in Nelson, refusing to drive a car, instead preferring to ride a bicycle everywhere locally which made him a visible addition to the community. He personally answered all messages and requests in his own handwriting as an indication of his dedication to his work.

Atmore married Dorothy Annie Corrigan on 24 June 1936, at the age of 65, at Hāwera. There were no children from the marriage. Dorothy was both wealthy and well-educated. The two built a new home named Te Maunga and made it a local centre of hospitality. Throughout World War II the two were both actively involved in patriotic work, which was to earn Dorothy an MBE. Dorothy lived a further thirty years as a widow, dying in 1976.

Atmore's grip on the Nelson seat was due primarily to his commitment and availability to his constituents. He organised a call to repair a country school, the completion of the Nelson railway, an exemption for an only son of an elderly farming couple from military service and helped issue jobs in the public service to the unemployed. For an entire generation Atmore worked for all Nelson residents with such a commitment that his constituents regarded him to be a personal friend.

Legacy

In 1935, he was awarded the King George V Silver Jubilee Medal.

Robert Chapman comments on Harry Atmore: 
Nelson even shares with Hobson a record of preferring political idiosyncrancy. Nine times out of ten between 1911 and 1946 Nelson voted for Harry Atmore, who confounded cynics by moving to the Left politically as he got older. Having begun as an Independent Liberal, he thereafter passed through many shades of independence to finish as his own variety of consistently pro-Labour MP.

Historians have regarded Atmore as the last example of an earlier, simpler political age, before the rise of the party system. He embodied the aspirations of small town residents and their desires for a fairer and more egalitarian society.

Books

"This Debt Slavery" by Harry Atmore, M.P. and John A. Lee, M.P. (1940 Budget Speeches, Commercial Printing & Publishing, Auckland).
"The Mortgage Corporation Bill" by Harry Atmore, M.P. and Capt. Harold Rushworth, M.P. (A copy is held at the Macmillan Brown Library, University of Canterbury, Christchurch).
"You and the USSR" by Harry Atmore, M.P. and 'Uncle Scrim' i.e. Colin G. Scrimgeour (1941, Society for Closer Relations with Russia, Wellington).

References

External links
 Harry Atmore's Political Papers. National Register of Archives and Manuscripts

See also
The Atmore Report, 1930

1870 births
1946 deaths
Independent MPs of New Zealand
Members of the Cabinet of New Zealand
Nelson City Councillors
New Zealand businesspeople
People from Nelson, New Zealand
New Zealand education ministers
New Zealand MPs for South Island electorates
Members of the New Zealand House of Representatives
Burials at Wakapuaka Cemetery
Unsuccessful candidates in the 1902 New Zealand general election
Unsuccessful candidates in the 1905 New Zealand general election
Unsuccessful candidates in the 1908 New Zealand general election
Unsuccessful candidates in the 1914 New Zealand general election
People associated with the Cawthron Institute